Hadleyville may refer to:

Hadleyville, Nova Scotia, Canada
Hadleyville, Wisconsin, United States
Hadleyville, the setting of the 1952 film High Noon